Frank Teruggi, Jr. (1949–1973) was an American student, journalist, and member of the Industrial Workers of the World, from Chicago, Illinois, who became one of the victims of General Augusto Pinochet's military shortly after the September 11, 1973 Pinochet coup d'état against Socialist President Salvador Allende.

A Chilean court in 2014 found that the United States played a key role in Teruggi's murder.

September 11, 1973
On September 11, 1973, the Chilean presidential Palace was bombed, and president Salvador Allende died. A coup d'état led by General Augusto Pinochet took place in Chile and a military regime was imposed.  
Teruggi's death, as well as the death of fellow journalist Charles Horman, occurred as a part of the wave of killings, torture and kidnappings that took place as the military regime solidified its control over the government of Chile. Teruggi's death along with Horman's death were the subject of the 1982 Costa-Gavras film Missing.

Arrest and death
On September 20, 1973, nine days after the coup d'état, Frank Teruggi, in the same way as Charles Horman, was seized by the Chilean military at his home and taken to the National Stadium in Santiago, which had been turned into an ad hoc concentration camp, where prisoners were interrogated and tortured and many were executed.

In the film Missing, by Costa-Gavras, Teruggi is depicted as a contributor for a small newspaper and friend of Charles Horman who had spoken with several US operatives that assisted the Chilean military government. The film alleges that Horman's discovery of US complicity in the coup led to his secret arrest, disappearance, and execution.

American complicity in the Chilean coup was later confirmed in documents declassified during the Clinton administration. The declassified documents mention Teruggi as one of the Chilean military executions and initially US embassy officials in Santiago released false information that he had returned to the United States. His body was later found in a Chilean morgue among the "unidentified bodies" of the victims of the regime.

Book, film, and television depictions of the case
The main character of the Missing (1982),  directed by Greek filmmaker Costa-Gavras, was Charles Horman, but Teruggi is also depicted and his fate is described in the film by David Hathaway, his roommate who was arrested at the same time Teruggi was.  Teruggi was portrayed by actor Joe Regalbuto.

When the film was released by Universal Studios, Nathaniel Davis, United States Ambassador to Chile from 1971 to 1973, filed a USD $150 million libel suit against the director and the studio, although he was not named directly in the movie (he had been named in the book).  The court eventually dismissed Davis's suit. The film was removed from the market during the lawsuit but re-released upon dismissal of the suit.

State Department memo
For many years thereafter, the US government steadfastly maintained its ignorance of the killing and torture of Americans in Chile. It was only in October 1999, that President Bill Clinton ordered the release of a document admitting that US intelligence agents played a role in the deaths of Americans.
The United States Department of State memo, dated August 25, 1976, was declassified on October 8, 1999, together with 1,100 other documents released by various US agencies which dealt primarily with the years leading up to the military coup.

Written by three State Department functionaries — Rudy Fimbres, R.S. Driscolle and W.V. Robertson and addressed to Harry Shlaudeman, a high-ranking official in the department's Latin American division — the memo described the Horman case and mentions Teruggi's as well.

2011 indictments
On November 29, 2011, Chilean judge Jorge Zepeda indicted Ray E. Davis, commander of the U.S. Military Group in Chile during the time of the coup, along with Pedro Espinoza, a Chilean general, and Rafael González Verdugo, a member of Chilean army intelligence, in the murders of Frank Teruggi and Charles Horman. Teruggi and Horman were among the 40,000 who were detained in the Stadium. In 2012, Chile’s Supreme Court approved an extradition request for Davis. As of September 11, 2013, the U.S. had not been served with the request. Davis, secretly living in Chile, died in a Santiago nursing home in 2013.

In 2015 the court sentenced Espinoza to 7 and Verdugo to 2 years. Chile's Supreme Court however reviewed the case in 2016 and significantly increased the sentences to 15 years for Espinoza and 3 years for Verdugo. In addition they were ordered to pay $196,000 to Horman's widow and $151,000 to Teruggi's sister.

See also
Charles Horman
1970 Chilean presidential election
Juan Guzman
Operation Condor
U.S. intervention in Chile
Chilean political scandals
United States intervention in Chile#1973 coup
Memoriaviva (Complete list of Victims, Torture Centres and Criminals - in Spanish)
Jeffrey Davidow

References
Notes

Bibliography
Hauser, Thomas (1978).  The Execution of Charles Horman:  An American Sacrifice.  New York:  Harcourt Brace Jovanovich.
Hauser, Thomas (1982).  Missing.  Penguin.  .

External links
State Dept. Memos regarding Horman (both the blacked-out version given to the family and the more complete version released in 1999)

1949 births
1973 deaths
American people executed abroad
Assassinated American journalists
Military dictatorship of Chile (1973–1990)
Harvard University alumni
Industrial Workers of the World members
Phillips Exeter Academy alumni
20th-century executions of American people
20th-century executions by Chile
20th-century American writers